Troitsko-Pechorsky District (Myldïn rajon, [ˈmɨldin ˈrajon]) is an administrative district (raion), one of the twelve in the Komi Republic, Russia. It is located in the southeast of the republic. Its administrative center is the urban locality (an urban-type settlement) of Troitsko-Pechorsk. As of the 2010 Census, the total population of the district was 13,925, with the population of Troitsko-Pechorsk accounting for 52.3% of that number.

Administrative and municipal status
Within the framework of administrative divisions, Troitsko-Pechorsky District is one of the twelve in the Komi Republic. It is divided into one urban-type settlement administrative territory (Troitsko-Pechorsk), three selo administrative territories, and seven settlement administrative territories, all of which comprise thirty-one rural localities. As a municipal division, the district is incorporated as Troitsko-Pechorsky Municipal District. Troitsko-Pechorsk Urban-Type Settlement Administrative Territory is incorporated into an urban settlement, and the ten remaining administrative territories are incorporated into ten rural settlements within the municipal district. The urban-type settlement of Troitsko-Pechorsk serves as the administrative center of both the administrative and municipal district.

References

Notes

Sources

Districts of the Komi Republic
